Marhaug is a surname of Scandinavian origin.

List of persons with the surname

L
Lasse Marhaug (born 1974), musician

S
Sofie Marhaug (born 1990), politician

Norwegian-language surnames